Pawn most often refers to:
 Pawn (chess), the weakest and most numerous piece in the game
 Pawnbroker or pawnshop, a business that provides loans by taking personal property as collateral

Pawn may also refer to:

Places
 Pawn, Oregon, an historic forest community
 Pawn River, Burma
 Noatak Airport, International Civil Aviation Organization code PAWN

Arts, entertainment, and media
 Pawn (2013 film), an American film
 The Pawn (film), a 1978 French film
 Pawn (2020 film), a South Korean film
 The Pawn, a 1980s text adventure
 "Pawns", a song on the 2017 Paloma Faith album The Architect

Other uses
 Pawnship, debt bondage slavery
 Pawn, another name for a pledge in certain jurisdictions

People with the surname
 Doris Pawn (1894–1988), an American actress of the silent film era

See also
 Pawn Stars (disambiguation)

 Porn (disambiguation)
 Prawn (disambiguation)